Apostolepis vittata, the beaked blackhead, is a species of snake in the family Colubridae. It is found in Brazil and Bolivia.

References 

vittata
Reptiles described in 1887
Reptiles of Brazil
Reptiles of Bolivia
Taxa named by Edward Drinker Cope